"This Time the Dream's on Me" is a song composed by Harold Arlen, with lyrics by Johnny Mercer. It was written for the 1941 film Blues in the Night when it was sung by Priscilla Lane.

1941 recordings
Hit versions in 1941 were by Glenn Miller (vocal by Ray Eberle) (reached No. 11 in the charts) and by Woody Herman (No. 8).

Selected notable recordings
Kenny Burrell – Introducing Kenny Burrell  (1956)
June Christy – Something Cool  (1954)
Ella Fitzgerald – Ella Fitzgerald Sings the Harold Arlen Songbook (1961), Ella Fitzgerald Sings the Johnny Mercer Songbook (1964)  Ella Fitzgerald: Best of the Song Books – the Ballads (Verve 1994 release)
Harry James – Harry James and His New Jazz Band, Vol. 2 (Mr. Music MMCD 7012, 1956 [2002])
Steve March-Tormé – The Essence of Love (2003).
Susannah McCorkle – The Songs of Johnny Mercer (1981).
Marian McPartland – Live at Maybeck Recital Hall Vol.9 (1997)
Stephanie Nakasian – Lullaby in Rhythm: In Tribute to June Christy (2002)
Anthony Newley – Love Is a Now and Then Thing (1960).
Nancy Wilson – Something Wonderful (1960)
Tony Bennett – Sings a String of Harold Arlen (1961)
Charlie Parker – Bird on 52nd St. (1948), One Night In Birdland (1950), Live Boston, Philadelphia, Brooklyn 1951 (1951), Bird Is Free (1952)
Alison Krauss – Midnight in the Garden of Good and Evil (1997) Soundtrack
Jeri Southern – The Dream's on Jeri (1998)
Mel Tormé – An Elegant Evening (1985)
Harry Connick Jr. – for his album 25 (1992)
Boz Scaggs- Speak Low (2008)

References

Songs with music by Harold Arlen
Songs with lyrics by Johnny Mercer
Nancy Wilson (jazz singer) songs
1941 songs